Mink Tunnel, located on the north shore of Lake Superior in Ontario, Canada, is a railway tunnel constructed in 1884 for the Canadian Pacific Railway (CPR). The contractor was Kenneth McLeod.  It is located west of the town of Marathon, on a stretch of railway that is along a body of water known as Mink Harbour.

References 

 

Canadian Pacific Railway tunnels
Railway tunnels in Ontario